The European Chemical Site Promotion Platform (ECSPP) was founded in 2005 to promote new investments in Europe's chemical industrial complexes.

Origins
The idea of ECSPP was developed at the 2002 European Petrochemical Association (EPCA) Annual Meeting in Berlin between Peter Anderton of the Port of Rotterdam and Neil Kenley of SembCorp Utilities UK Ltd.

One of the conclusions emerging from this discussion was that European chemical sites could benefit from having a forum where information and insights on matters of common interest could be exchanged. In particular, it was felt that Europe needed to be more pro-active in profiling itself as an attractive region for new chemical investment.

Brainstorming session
In November 2003, Peter Anderton invited a number of chemical site management organizations to Rotterdam to take part in a brainstorming session to determine whether there was wider support for setting up such a forum, to be known as European Chemical Site Promotion Platform (ECSPP). There was enthusiastic backing for the idea and it was decided to develop the framework and conditions required to establish ECSPP as a formal organization.

Steering committee
A steering committee was formed to manage this process and in the course of 2004, a Business Plan was drafted. At a plenary meeting in March 2005, the Business Plan was approved unanimously and the decision was taken to proceed with the formal establishment of ECSPP.

ECSPP was officially launched at a Press Conference held during EPCA's Annual Meeting in September 2005 in Vienna.

The North East of England Process Industry Cluster are members of ECSPP.

External links
ECSPP official website

Business organizations based in Europe
Chemical industry